João Pires Sobrinho (born 6 October 1934) is a Brazilian sprinter. He competed in the men's 100 metres at the 1956 Summer Olympics.

References

External links
 

1934 births
Living people
Athletes (track and field) at the 1956 Summer Olympics
Athletes (track and field) at the 1959 Pan American Games
Brazilian male sprinters
Olympic athletes of Brazil
Athletes from Rio de Janeiro (city)
Pan American Games athletes for Brazil
20th-century Brazilian people